DeQuincy is the northernmost city in Calcasieu Parish, Louisiana, United States. The population was 3,235 at the 2010 census. DeQuincy is part of the Lake Charles metropolitan statistical area.

History
DeQuincy was founded in 1897 as a railroad town with the Calcasieu, Vernon & Shreveport Railway Company (CV&S) having been completed and Arthur Stilwell's Kansas City, Shreveport & Gulf Railway Company (KCS&G), that was owned by the Kansas City, Pittsburg and Gulf Railroad (KCP&G), completed in 1897. 

On 8 March 1944, two Air Force aircraft from nearby Barksdale Air Force Base collided overhead killing seven people.

Geography
DeQuincy is located in northern Calcasieu Parish at  (30.450915, -93.435613).

Demographics

As of the 2020 United States census, there were 3,144 people, 972 households, and 720 families residing in the city.

Economy
DeQuincy was founded as a railroad settlement, and the Kansas City Southern and Union Pacific railroads remain principal employers for area citizens.

The timber industry has long been a vital part of the local economy. DeQuincy is home to Temple-Inland's Southwest Louisiana Lumber Operation.

The DeQuincy Industrial Airpark houses facilities for Thermoplastic Services, Recycle Inc., United Oilfield Services, and Paragon Plastic Sheet. In 2002, Calgon Carbon Corporation planned to construct a carbon reactivation plant in the airpark, though those plans have been delayed due to environmental concerns.

Government and infrastructure
The former Grand Avenue High School was the site of the highest scoring boys high school basketball game on January 29, 1964, when Grand Avenue beat Cameron, Louisiana's Audrey Memorial High School by a score of 211 to 29.

The United States Postal Service operates the DeQuincy Post Office.

The facility closed in November 2012

Education
Calcasieu Parish Public Schools operates public schools:
 DeQuincy High School
 DeQuincy Middle School
 DeQuincy Elementary School
 DeQuincy Primary School

Subject of multiple hoaxes
The town has been the subject of numerous hoaxes by satirical writer Paul Horner, widely spread on the Internet. The hoaxes claim the town enacted bizarre legislation such as banning those of Korean descent, issuing handguns to school children, permitting bigamy, banning twerking, and the city being completely eradicated by zombies on bath salts.

DeQuincy Mayor Lawrence Henagan, a Democrat, was falsely targeted in 2016 by an Internet hoax that he had jailed a volunteer fire chief for thirty days and then dismissed the man after the chief had prayed at the scene of a fire. The story identified the mayor as "Lawana Jones, an African-American atheist" and the fire chief as "39-year-old Ronnie Edwards." Henagan, the chairman of the deacon board at the First Baptist Church of DeQuincy, said that the chief is free to pray while firefighting. Henagan said he would join the fire chief in prayer. Henagan said that he has no knowledge why he was singled out for a fake news article but noted that he could take no legal action because the reports used fictitious names.

Notable people
Burl Cain, warden of Louisiana State Penitentiary since 1995, formerly resided in DeQuincy.
Johnny Dowers, actor, writer, composer and musician who has appeared on the TV series GCB and Charmed.  He has been cast as Detective Tim Cooper in the police drama series The Bridge.
Tina Girouard, award-winning video and performance artist whose work is in the collections of museums such as the Museum of Modern Art, New Orleans Museum of Art, and Museo Rufino Tamayo, was born in DeQuincy.
Smiley Lewis, rhythm and blues musician whose songs have been covered by Fats Domino, Elvis Presley, Dave Edmunds, and Aerosmith
 Hanna Nicole and Ashley Grance from the American duo Ha*Ash, singers
Anthony Pullard, NBA player for the Milwaukee Bucks.
Craig Stark is an actor and filmmaker who has appeared on the TV series Empty Nest, Guns of Paradise, Booker, Nashville, and Sleepy Hollow.  He film roles have included parts in Homefront, Honey Boy, and the Quentin Tarantino films Django Unchained and The Hateful Eight.  He currently resides in Los Angeles.
Scott Brown, retired major league baseball pitcher.

References

External links

City of DeQuincy official website
The DeQuincy News

Cities in Louisiana
Cities in Calcasieu Parish, Louisiana
Cities in Lake Charles metropolitan area